John IV (19 March 1604 – 6 November 1656), nicknamed John the Restorer, was the King of Portugal whose reign, lasting from 1640 until his death, began the Portuguese restoration of independence from Habsburg Spanish rule. His accession established the House of Braganza on the Portuguese throne, and marked the end of the 60-year-old Iberian Union by which Portugal and Spain shared the same monarch.

Before becoming king, he was John II, 8th Duke of Braganza. He was the grandson of Catherine, Duchess of Braganza, a claimant to the crown during the Portuguese succession crisis of 1580. On the eve of his death in 1656, the Portuguese Empire was at its territorial zenith, spanning the globe.

Early life 

John IV was born at Vila Viçosa and succeeded his father Teodósio II as Duke of Braganza when the latter died insane in 1630. He married Luisa de Guzmán (1613–66), eldest daughter of Juan Manuel Pérez de Guzmán, 8th Duke of Medina Sidonia, in 1633. John was described as having blonde hair, and an average height.

Reign

Accession 

When Philip II of Portugal (III of Spain) died, he was succeeded by his son Philip III (IV of Spain), who had a different approach to Portuguese issues. Taxes on the Portuguese merchants were raised, the Portuguese nobility began to lose its influence and government posts in Portugal were increasingly occupied by Spaniards. Ultimately, Philip III tried to make Portugal a Spanish province, meaning Portuguese nobles stood to lose all of their power.

This situation culminated in a revolution organized by the nobility and the bourgeoisie, executed on 1 December 1640, fifty-nine years after the accession of Philip II of Spain to the throne of Portugal. A plot was planned by several associates, known as the Forty Conspirators, who killed the Secretary of State, Miguel de Vasconcelos, and imprisoned the king's cousin, Margaret of Savoy, the Vicereine of Portugal, governing the country in the King's name. Philip's troops were at the time fighting the Thirty Years' War and also dealing with a revolution in Catalonia which severely hampered Spain's ability to quash the rebellion.

Within a matter of hours and with popular support, John, then the 8th Duke of Braganza, was acclaimed as King John IV of Portugal (as legend goes, with the persuasion of his wife) claiming legitimate succession through his grandmother Catherine, Duchess of Braganza. The ensuing conflict with Spain brought Portugal into the Thirty Years' War as, at least, a peripheral player. From 1641 to 1668, the period during which the two nations were at war, Spain sought to isolate Portugal militarily and diplomatically, and Portugal tried to find the resources to maintain its independence through political alliances and maintenance of its colonial income.

Restoration War 
His accession led to a protracted war with neighbouring Spain, a conflict known as the Portuguese Restoration War, which ended with the recognition of Portuguese independence in a subsequent reign (1668).  Portugal signed lengthy alliances with France (1 June 1641) and Sweden (August 1641) but by necessity its only contributions in the Thirty Years' War were in the field against Spain and against Dutch encroachments on the Portuguese colonies.

The period from 1640 to 1668 was marked by periodic skirmishes between Portugal and Spain, as well as short episodes of more serious warfare, much of it occasioned by Spanish and Portuguese entanglements with non-Iberian powers. Spain was involved in the Thirty Years' War until 1648 and the Franco-Spanish War until 1659, while Portugal was involved in the Dutch–Portuguese War until 1663. In Spain, a Portuguese invasion force defeated the Spanish at Montijo, near Badajoz, in 1644.

Imperial Recovery 
Abroad, the Dutch took Portuguese Malacca (January 1641), and the Imam of Oman captured Muscat (1650). Nevertheless, the Portuguese, despite having to divide their forces among Europe, Brazil and Africa, managed to retake Luanda, in Portuguese Angola, from the Dutch in 1648 and, by 1654, had recovered northern Brazil, which effectively ceased to be a Dutch colony. This was countered by the loss of Portuguese Ceylon (present day Sri Lanka) to the Dutch, who took Colombo in 1656.

Death and legacy
King John IV died in 1656 and was succeeded by his son Afonso VI. His daughter, Catherine of Braganza, married King Charles II of England.

John was a patron of music and the arts, and a considerably sophisticated writer on music; in addition to this, he was a composer. During his reign he collected one of the largest libraries in the world, but it was destroyed in the Lisbon earthquake of 1755. Among his writings is a defense of Palestrina, and a Defense of Modern Music (Lisbon, 1649). One famous composition attributed to him is a setting of the Crux fidelis, a work that remains highly popular during Holy Week amongst church choirs. However, no known manuscript of the work exists, and it was first published only in 1869, in France. On stylistic grounds, it is generally recognized that the work was written in the 19th century.

In 1646, John IV proclaimed Mary, in her conception as the Immaculate Conception (the 'Immaculata'), the Patroness of Portugal by royal decree of the House of Braganza. The doctrine had appeared in the Middle Ages and had been fiercely debated in the 15th and 16th centuries, but a bull issued in 1616 by Pope Paul V finally "[forbade] anyone to teach or preach a contrary opinion." Three years later, in 1649, the iconography of the Immaculata was established by Francisco Pacheco (1564–1654), a Spanish artistic advisor to the Inquisition, based on Revelation XII:1.

Marriages and descendants
John married Luisa de Guzmán, daughter of Juan Manuel Pérez de Guzmán, 8th Duke of Medina-Sidonia. From that marriage several children were born. Because some of John's children were born and died before their father became king they are not considered infantes or infantas (heirs to the throne) of Portugal.

Ancestry

References

Bibliography

External links

 
 Crux fidelis Recording of John IV's best-known choral work

1604 births
1656 deaths
17th-century classical composers
17th-century Portuguese monarchs
Burials at the Monastery of São Vicente de Fora
Constables of Portugal
Dukes of Barcelos
Dukes of Braganza
Dukes of Guimarães
House of Braganza
Portuguese male classical composers
People from Vila Viçosa
Portuguese Baroque composers
Portuguese infantes
Portuguese monarchs
Rebellious princes
Royal reburials